Charlie Phillips is the head of documentary acquisition and production and The Guardian, and a former deputy director of Sheffield Doc/Fest in the United Kingdom.

Early life 
Phillips was born in Leeds, UK.

Career
After working at various jobs in the TV and film industry, Phillips set up a short film night in London. He became the editor of Channel 4’s BAFTA-winning online documentary channel, FourDocs.

In 2008 he joined Doc/Fest as marketplace director, organising the annual MeetMarket pitching event. After seeing 5 Broken Cameras pitched in Tel Aviv in 2010, Phillips brought it to the MeetMarket. It went on to be nominated for an Academy Award.

Phillips is a proponent of crowdfunding and digital distribution for documentaries.  In 2012 Phillips led a successful crowdfunding campaign for Sheffield Doc/Fest. He was promoted to deputy director in 2013. At the 2012 Doc/Fest, Phillips participated in a panel discussion about corporate funding of documentaries.  He has appeared on BBC Radio 4's The Film Programme.

In September, 2014, Phillips left his position at Doc/Fest to work for The Guardian, as head of its documentary acquisition and production department.

References

External links 
 

British documentary film producers
1980 births
Living people